Octavio Antonio Mejías Hernández (born July 21, 1982) is a Venezuelan weightlifter. His personal best is 342.5 kg.

He won the bronze medal at the 2007 Pan American Games in the 77 kg division. Fellow countryman José Ocando won silver.

At the 2004 Summer Olympics he ranked 12th in the men's 77kg weightlifting competition, lifting a total of 342.5 kg.
He competed in Weightlifting at the 2008 Summer Olympics in the 77 kg division but did not finish.

He is 5 ft 3 inches tall and weighs 170 lb.

Notes and references 
sports-reference

External links
 NBC profile
 Athlete Biography MEJIAS Octavio Antonio at beijing2008

Living people
1982 births
Venezuelan male weightlifters
Weightlifters at the 2004 Summer Olympics
Weightlifters at the 2008 Summer Olympics
Weightlifters at the 2003 Pan American Games
Weightlifters at the 2007 Pan American Games
Olympic weightlifters of Venezuela
Pan American Games bronze medalists for Venezuela
Pan American Games medalists in weightlifting
Medalists at the 2007 Pan American Games
20th-century Venezuelan people
21st-century Venezuelan people